12 Tonadillas en estilo antiguo, H. 136, is a collection of 12 songs by Spanish composer Enrique Granados with texts by . Together with  they are considered to be the most importand vocal works by Granados.

Composition and publication history
The original title of the composition is Collección de tonadillas escritas en estilo antiguo. The songs were first published in 1912-1913 and 1915 by Casa Dotesio (its name being changed in 1913 to Unión musical Española). When the collection was finished, the order of the songs was rearranged. Hence, there are two numbering systems.

External Links

1915 compositions
Compositions by Enrique Granados
Song cycles